Savignia fronticornis is a species of sheet weaver found in Mediterranean. It was described by Eugène Simon in 1884.

References

Linyphiidae
Spiders described in 1884
Spiders of Europe